Count Fyodor Logginovich Heiden (born Friedrich Moritz Reichsgraf van Heiden; , tr. ;  – ), better known as Count Fyodor Logginovich van Heiden, was a Russian military commander of German-Dutch extraction, who served in the Imperial Russian Army. He served as the Governor-General of Finland 1881–1898. Heiden's 17-year office in the Grand Duchy of Finland encompassed the entire reign of Alexander III of Russia, who appointed him at the start of his own reign, to succeed the courtly and diplomatic Count Nikolay Adlerberg, and four first years of reign of Nicholas II of Russia.

Background
Friedrich Moritz Reichsgraf van Heiden was born in Sveaborg, later renamed Suomenlinna, son of Dutch Lodewijk Sigismund Gustaaf van Heiden (6 September 1772 – 5 November 1850), who left Netherlands in 1795 during French invasion and settled in Livonia. Admiral van Heiden died in 1850. His mother was lady Anne-Marie Akeleye from a Danish family. Youngest son of family, Friedrich took military career, converted to Orthodoxy and took the Russified name of Fyodor Logginovich Geyden.

Earlier career
Young Heiden fought in Caucasus and against the Hungarian Revolutionary Army, whom Nicholas I. assisted Austrian emperor against. He was promoted to colonel in 1849. During Crimean War Heiden was chief of staff in Baltic Corps, without participation in notable battles. After the war was he was promoted to Major General in 1855.

He married in 1854 Countess Elisabeth Nikolayevna Zubova (1833–1894) whose mother was Countess Alexandra Raimond-Modène (1807–1839). Her father Count Nikolay Dmitrievich Zubov (1801–1871) was Steward of the Russian Imperial Court, himself son of princess Paraskeva Viazemskaia and general, count Dmitri Alexandrovich Zubov, one of brothers of prince Platon Zubov.
Countess Elisabeth was a first cousin of countess Olga van Suchtelen, one of heiresses of that Finnish comital house whose males in 1860s became extinct.

After the war Heiden was chiefly a member of the General Staff. He participated in Dmitry Milyutin's military reforms and was appointed as head of the General Staff (Glavni Stab) in 1866. He also chaired the conscription committee that enacted the conscription in Russia in 1874, and was in charge of the mobilization during the Turkish War; he was acting Minister of War during Milyutin's absence during the Turkish War.

In 1870 Heiden was promoted to full General. When he was eleven years later appointed as Governor-General of Finland, he had made a long and successful military career.

Governor-General

As it was usual with persons who adopted themselves a new nationality, Heiden was eagerly Russian.
In his position in Finland, the Slavophile Heiden saw his task to Russify the country. However, his reputation among the Finns is not very bad, because of his subtle methods - his successor, general Bobrikov, enjoys a really contrasting fame of a russifying tyrant.

To attain his goal Heiden supported use of Finnish as language of administration, university and military, as opposed to Swedish. In appointments to public offices in government, administration, justice, and military he favored the conservative and monarchist Finnish Party and persons who had learned the Russian language well and resided longer times there, as opposed to possibly separatist Swedes and liberal Swedish Party. Heiden furthered trade between Finland and Russia, and had customs formalities reduced.

His chief interest was to clarify jurisdiction within Finland: to define what decisions belonged to the imperial government, what to autonomous local governments in Finland.

He was awarded Order of Prince Danilo I and a number of other decorations.

References

Sources
  Seitkari, Olavi: Kenraalikuvernööri kreivi Fedor Logginovits Heiden , Genos 18 (1947), pp. 80–86

|-

1821 births
1900 deaths
Politicians from Helsinki
People from the Grand Duchy of Finland
Russian people of Dutch descent
Russian people of Danish descent
Governors of the Grand Duchy of Finland
Members of the State Council (Russian Empire)
Converts to Eastern Orthodoxy from Protestantism
Recipients of the Order of the White Eagle (Russia)
Recipients of the Order of Saint Stanislaus (Russian)
Danish people of Dutch descent
Dutch people of Danish descent
Burials at the Isidorovskaya Church of the Alexander Nevsky Lavra
Finnish people of Dutch descent
Imperial Russian Army generals